Helastia siris is a moth of the family Geometridae. This species is endemic to New Zealand. It is classified as "At Risk, Relict'" by the Department of Conservation.

Taxonomy
This species was first described by E. F. Hawthorne in 1897 using a specimen he collected in Wellington and named Asaphodes siris. George Hudson discussed and illustrated this species in his 1898 book under the same name and in his 1928 book as a synonym of Hydriomena triphragma. In 1987 Robin C. Craw placed this species within the genus Helastia. The holotype specimen is held at the Museum of New Zealand Te Papa Tongarewa.

Description
Hudson described the species as follows:

Distribution
This species is endemic to New Zealand. It occurs in Wellington, Stephens Island and in the Chatham Islands. It has been collected from Baring Head.

Biology and lifecycle
Very little is known about the biology of H. siris. It is on the wing in March.

Host species and habitat
This species prefers short tussock grassland habitat in coastal areas. The host species for the larvae of H. siris is unknown. It has been hypothesised the larvae of H. siris feed on the flowers of Helichrysum species and then feed on mosses, lichens or shrubs growing nearby.

Conservation status
This moth is classified under the New Zealand Threat Classification system as being "At Risk, Relict".

References

External links

Image of holotype specimen

Moths of New Zealand
Endemic fauna of New Zealand
Moths described in 1897
Cidariini
Endangered biota of New Zealand
Endemic moths of New Zealand